Alma City is an unincorporated community in Waseca County, Minnesota, United States, south of Janesville.

Geography
The community is located along Waseca County Road 9 (320th Avenue) near County Road 54.  Alma City is located within Alton Township and Freedom Township.  Nearby places include Janesville, Pemberton, and Waldorf.  County Road 3 is also in the immediate area.  The Le Sueur River flows nearby.

History
Alma City was platted in 1865, and named for Alma Hills, the daughter of an early settler. A post office was established at Alma City in 1870, and remained in operation until 1957.

References
,

Unincorporated communities in Waseca County, Minnesota
Unincorporated communities in Minnesota